is a 2019 Japanese anime television series created and produced by Nexus. The series was directed by Masaharu Watanabe and written by Jukki Hanada, with original character designs by Shinichirou Otsuka, and music composed by Kenichiro Suehiro. Granbelm aired from July 5 to September 26, 2019 on the Animeism programming block. The series follows a group of 7 magical girls that pilot giant robots called "Armanox", where they fight in a battle royale where the winner obtains the title "Princeps Mage", allowing the user to wield all the magic inside the "Magiaconatus".

Premise
Long ago, the world was rich with magic, until the wizards and witches used magic to wage war on one another, bringing the world to the brink of destruction.

Mangetsu Kohinata finds her ordinary life forever changed when she discovers she is a mage and earns her own Armanox, the White Lily. As Mangetsu fights in the Granbelm, she meets other girls who fight to have their wishes granted.

Characters

Main characters

A seemingly normal high school student who suddenly finds herself caught in the middle of the Granbelm. She has no particular talents or aspirations, so she tries to be as helpful and friendly as possible to make up for it. Beneath this facade, however, she is very insecure about her being "empty." After meeting Shingetsu and becoming friends with her, she slowly begins to open up and decides to help make her wish come true. She is eventually revealed to actually be an artificial being created by the Magiaconatus to help Shingetsu win the Granbelm.

Though untrained, as a being made by Magiaconatus, she possessess enormous magical readings and can sometimes enter a state of extreme concentration, during which she is capable of overpowering her opponents through brute force. Shingetsu also teaches her how to summon her own familiar, Orca, a whale-like magical spirit that aids her in battle.

Her given name literally means "full moon", mirroring Shingetsu.

A mysterious young woman who moved back to Japan from Germany in order to compete in Granbelm. Although she is initially opposed to Mangetsu entering Granbelm, she teams up with her and teaches her how to fight, which leads to their friendship. She was once friends with Anna Fugo, until the latter's jealousy towards her magical talents ended their friendship. This led her to hate magic resulted in her wish for winning the Granbelm being to erase it completely. It is eventually revealed that the Magiaconatus already decided for her to become the Princeps Mage and the entire Granbelm is actually just a test to determine if she's worthy.

Due to her experience as a mage, she possesses a large arsenal of spells and tactics. Her trump card is Growth, a spirit that takes on the form of a giant golem.

Her family name literally means "new moon", mirroring Mangetsu.

Granbelm participants

A proud mage descending from one of Europe's most powerful mage families. She was once friends with Shingetsu, until she learned that she was brought in to become the family's successor over her, which led her to try to defeat her throughout the Granbelm to prove herself. By the time she discovered her mother wanted her to live a life free of the pressures of being a mage, it was too late as her jealousy of Shingetsu and obsession with beating her had caused her to fall into madness. She is the third mage to be eliminated from the Granbelm, after being defeated by Shingetsu. Afterwards, her existence was erased from the world, causing everyone not present during the battle to forget about her.

Despite having very low magical power, she is able to fight in the Granbelm due to her Armanox providing her with a great deal of magic. She specializes in her family's trademark magic of temperature control, allowing her to manipulate both fire and ice. She is also able to make decoys to fight her battles for her.

Although she was initially Anna's lackey, she really has no loyalty to Anna and only followed her orders out of convenience's sake. When she learns Anna is a weak mage, at least compared to Shingetsu, Suishō stops working for her. It is also heavily implied, and later confirmed, that she was the one who cursed Kuon's sister Shisui into a coma. However, Kuon discovers that Shisui actually tricked Suishō into consuming a part of her soul in order to give Kuon a chance to win the Granbelm.

She is the first opponent Mangetsu defeats in the Granbelm. With her stone shattered, Rosa can no longer participate in the Granbelm and Anna throws her out of her house. In the new reality created after Anna's defeat, she is the elder daughter of the Fugo family.

A mage who hails from Hong Kong who fights in the Granbelm with tactical assistance from her sisters; Nana and Mimi. Although she's an adult, her child-like body has caused her to be assigned to a middle school, where she becomes acquainted to Kibō, Mangetsu's younger sister. She is the second mage to be eliminated from the Granbelm, after being defeated by Mangetsu. Afterwards, she continues to keep an eye on events and later begins investigating the phenomenon where Anna was erased from reality, which eventually leads her to uncover Mangetsu's nature as well as the truth behind the Granbelm.

Because of this, it relies on stealth and its powerful long-range abilities to fight. However, its true form is that of a huge mecha, several times larger than other Armanox, which uses its sheer size and longer reach for close quarters combat.

 The younger daughter of the Tsuchimikado family. She participates in the Granblem in the hopes of finding a cure for her sister Shisui, who has fallen into a magically induced coma. She later becomes enemies with Suishō, suspecting that she is responsible for her sister's condition. She also agrees to an alliance with Mangetsu and Shingetsu, so they can survive the Granbelm. Kuon is one of the very few that remembers Anna after her defeat in the Granbelm causes her to be erased from history. As the Granbelm continues, Kuon realizes Suishō consumed a part of Shisui's soul and Suishō uses this particular information in an attempt to demoralize Kuon, but Kuon later discovers that Shisui only did that so that Kuon could have a chance at winning the Granbelm. Despite her renewed efforts, however, Kuon is killed by Suishō and the Magiaconatus alters reality so that everyone, except the remaining Granbelm fighters, forget she ever existed, much like Anna before her.

Supporting characters

Mangetsu's younger sister, who is unaware of her role in the Granbelm. In reality, however, she and her family are just being made to believe that Mangetsu is her older sister by the Magiaconatus. After Mangetsu's true nature is discovered, she and her family forget she ever existed.

Nene's younger sister, who gives her tactical assistance in the Granbelm. She has the appearance of a high-school student.

Nene's youngest sister, who gives her tactical assistance in the Granbelm. Despite being the youngest her mature appearance makes her seem like she's the oldest.

Anna's younger sister. Much like Anna, she knew Shingetsu since childhood, but unlike her sister, she never stopped loving her and hoped she would return to the Fugo family. After Anna is erased from reality, she forgets she ever existed and now believes Rosa to be her older sister.

 The Fugos family's servant.

 The elder daughter of the Tsuchimikado family and Kuon's sister. She has been placed into a coma and Kuon participates in the Granbelm in order to save her.

Production
The producer of Granbelm, Takayuki Nagatani, approached the animation studio Nexus in wanting to create a new series with them. Nexus told Nagatani that they are interested in creating an anime that features a "chibi-style robots", and Nagatani accepted the idea as he also love those kind of anime. Nagatani left the creative process to the studio while he would organize it. While hiring the Granbelms staff, Nagatani and the studio firstly decided to bring a director, with Nexus suggesting Masaharu Watanabe as the director for the series since they worked with him in his production of Re:Zero − Starting Life in Another World, thus Watanabe was appointed as the director. The series composition was handled by Jukki Hanada. When deciding on who should be responsible for the series' character design, the staff discussed that they wanted "mellow visuals for the animation because it’s the story of girls fighting with all their might", hearing that, director Watanabe suggested Shinichiro Otsuka, who's known for illustrating the artwork for Re:Zeros light novel. For the mecha designs, Nexus recommended Jimmy Stone.

Nagatani stated that Anna, a controversial character in the series, is the character he liked the most and stated that he understands her "personality" and sympathized with the character for carrying a "heavy burden". He praised Hanada on his ability for making each of the main characters "charming as well as unique", and states that "each character has their own great attributes" but Anna is the one that fascinates him the most. Nagatani thinks that as the story progresses, the viewers' favorite character will change. During the scenario meetings, the staff had agreed on the idea of "girls and magic" themed-series. When asked on why there aren't any male character in the series, Nagatani replied: "We decided that the Granbelm would be an all-girl battle pretty early on. I can’t even recall us talking about any male characters joining the battle. We called the participants of the battle ‘witches’ and the story was about the female line of the family. I think that’s why we didn’t even consider a male character. I’d say that it naturally became an all-girls affair."

The anime was announced by Nexus on March 1, 2019. The series is directed by Masaharu Watanabe, with Jukki Hanada handling series composition, Shinichirou Otsuka as the original character designer, and Kenichiro Suehiro composing the music. Infinite is producing the anime. Eir Aoi performed the series' opening theme song , while Uru performed the series' ending theme song .

Release
Granbelm aired from July 5 to September 26, 2019 on the Animeism programming block on MBS, TBS, and BS-TBS. It is streaming on Crunchyroll, which teams with Sentai Filmworks to release the series on home video in the United States.

Episode list

Reception
Granbelm was well-received by critics, with Andy Pfeiffer of Anime News Network listing the series as one of the best series of the summer 2019 anime season. Patrick Frye of Monsters and Critics described the series as "a mashup of multiple genres from super-powered robots to magical girls with a tragic destiny ala Madoka Magica", while also noting that its "battle royale" is similar to the Fate series. Frye nevertheless wrote that the series "manages to stand on its own by having fun character development and enough major plot twists to surprise audiences" and states the finale "provide a satisfying spectacle".

See also
Magic Knight Rayearth

References

External links
  
 

2019 anime television series debuts
Anime with original screenplays
Animeism
Crunchyroll anime
Magical girl anime and manga
Mecha anime and manga
Nexus (animation studio)
Sentai Filmworks